Xu Tingting (born 11 January 1990) is a Chinese paralympic badminton player. She participated at the 2020 Summer Paralympics in the badminton competition, being awarded the silver medal in the women's singles WH2 event. Tingting was also a player of wheelchair basketball. According to the International Paralympic Committee, the article stated that Tingting was "very strong".

Achievements

Paralympic Games 
Women's singles

World Championships 
Women's singles

Asian Para Games 
Women's singles

Women's doubles

International Tournaments (1 title, 5 runners-up) 
Women's singles

Women's doubles

References 

Living people
Place of birth missing (living people)
Chinese female badminton players
Paralympic badminton players of China
Paralympic silver medalists for China
Paralympic medalists in badminton
Badminton players at the 2020 Summer Paralympics
Medalists at the 2020 Summer Paralympics
Women's wheelchair basketball players
1990 births
21st-century Chinese women

Notes